Jeffrey E. Garten (born October 29, 1946) is an American economist, author, businessman, and former government official who is Dean Emeritus at the Yale School of Management, where he teaches a variety of courses on global economy. From 1996 to 2005 he was the dean of the school, and from 2005 to 2015 he was the Juan Trippe Professor in international trade, finance, and business. Before that, he was Undersecretary of Commerce for International Trade in the Clinton administration from 1993 to 1995, and had a career on Wall Street as a managing director for the Blackstone Group and Lehman Brothers.

He is the author of six books on the global political economy and numerous articles in The New York Times, The Wall Street Journal, Financial Times, Newsweek, Foreign Affairs, and Harvard Business Review. From 1997 to 2005 he wrote a monthly column in Business Week.

Early life and career
Garten was born to a Jewish family. He is the son of Ruth (née Engelman) and Melvin Garten. His father fought in World War II, the Korean War, and Vietnam; and was awarded the Distinguished Service Cross in 1953 for his heroism in Korea's Battle of Pork Chop Hill. His brother, Allan Garten, is a retired federal prosecutor in Portland, Oregon. Due to Melvin Garten's military career, the family moved frequently.

Education 
Garten earned his A.B. from Dartmouth College in 1968 and an M.A. (1972) and Ph.D. (1980) from the Johns Hopkins University's School of Advanced International Studies. He also served in the United States Army from 1968 to 1972, during the Vietnam War, holding the rank of Lieutenant in the 82nd Airborne Division and Captain and aide-de camp to the commanding general of the US Special Forces. In 1971 he was an advisor to the Royal Thai Army.

Career 
Garten worked in the Nixon, Ford and Carter administrations in both the White House and at the State Department. He then went on to Wall Street, becoming a managing director of Lehman Brothers and the Blackstone Group. At Lehman, he specialized in sovereign debt restructuring in Latin America. He also lived in Tokyo and directed and expanded the Asian investment banking business for that firm, including overseeing some of the largest international corporate restructurings of the era. At Blackstone he worked in the financial advisory and mergers and acquisitions arena. Garten founded the Eliot Group, an investments firm, in 1990, and was its first chairman. He then taught at Columbia Business School from 1992 to 1993.

From July 1993 to September 1995, Garten was Undersecretary of Commerce for International Trade in the Clinton administration where he focused his efforts on trade and investment deals in "Big Emerging Markets" such as China, India, Indonesia Brazil, Mexico, and Turkey. Afterward, from 1996 to 2005, Garten was dean of the Yale School of Management after which he stayed on to teach full-time. His courses have included "Leading A Global Company", "Wall Street and Washington", "Managing Global Catastrophes", and "The Future of Global Finance", and he has led study trips for students to China, Singapore, the United Arab Emirates, and the United Kingdom.

In 2006, Garten and a colleague, David Rothkopf, set up Garten Rothkopf in Washington to provide strategic advice for global companies, international organizations and governments. In 2016 the firm was sold to The Slate Group, a subsidiary of Graham Holdings, Inc.

Garten sits on the board of directors for Credit Suisse Asset Management (which includes a number of mutual funds), and he is a trustee of The International Rescue Committee. Previously, he was a director of Aetna, CarMax, Inc., Standard & Poor's ("the Board of Managers"), Calpine Energy Corporation, Alcan Inc., and The Conference Board, and he served on the international advisory boards of Toyota and the Chicago Climate Exchange.

Personal life
Garten has been married to the former Ina Rosenberg since 1968. Ina Garten hosts Food Network's Barefoot Contessa, for which she has won three Emmy Awards. She has also written ten best-selling cookbooks, including Cooking for Jeffrey in 2016. Garten and his wife  live in Southport, Connecticut, and East Hampton, New York.

Activities at Yale
Garten has been teaching a number of courses at the Yale School of Management:
 "The Future of Global Finance"
 "Managing Global Catastrophes"
 "Wall Street and Washington: Markets, Policies, and Politics"
 "Understanding Global Financial Centers"
 "Leading a Global Company"

He has led the following International Study Trips with Yale students:
 Singapore: Public-Private Governance, 2007, 2008
 New York, London, Dubai, Hong Kong: What Makes a Competitive Financial Center?, 2008, 2009
 Shanghai, Beijing, Hong Kong: China in the Global Financial Market, 2010, 2011, 2012

Bibliography

References

External links
 
 www.jeffreygarten.com

1946 births
Living people
20th-century American businesspeople
20th-century American economists
20th-century American male writers
20th-century American non-fiction writers
21st-century American businesspeople
21st-century American economists
21st-century American male writers
21st-century American non-fiction writers
American business writers
American economics writers
American expatriates in Japan
American foreign policy writers
American male journalists
American male non-fiction writers
Carter administration personnel
Clinton administration personnel
Columbia Business School faculty
Dartmouth College alumni
Economists from Connecticut
Economists from New York (state)
Ford administration personnel
Jewish American writers
Lehman Brothers people
Members of the United States Army Special Forces
Nixon administration personnel
Paul H. Nitze School of Advanced International Studies alumni
People from East Hampton (town), New York
People from Southport, Connecticut
Phillips Academy alumni
Place of birth missing (living people)
The Blackstone Group people
United States Army officers
United States Army personnel of the Vietnam War
United States Department of State officials
United States Under Secretaries of Commerce
Writers from Connecticut
Writers from New York (state)
Yale School of Management faculty
Under Secretaries of Commerce for International Trade